Dipterocarpus cornutus is a species of tree in the family Dipterocarpaceae native to peninsular Malaysia, Singapore, Sumatra and Kalimantan. Reaching heights of up to 50 meters tall, it is known for having large leaves. Its flowers are around 4 cm in diameter and of a pale yellow colouration. It drops seeds with green holes in the middle.

References

cornutus
Flora of Kalimantan
Flora of Sumatra
Flora of Malaya
Critically endangered flora of Asia